PP-83 Khushab-II is a Constituency of Provincial Assembly of Punjab.

See also
 PP-82 Khushab-I
 PP-84 Khushab-III

References

External links
 Election commission Pakistan's official website
 Awazoday.com check result
 Official Website of Government of Punjab

Provincial constituencies of Punjab, Pakistan